Bithynia fuchsiana is a species of small freshwater snail with a gill and an operculum, an aquatic gastropod mollusk in the family Bithyniidae.

Distribution 
Distribution of this species includes:
 southern and eastern China
 Taiwan
 the Red River delta, Vietnam

Ecology 
Bithynia fuchsiana inhabits lentic habitats such as lakes, rice fields, ponds and others.

Bithynia fuchsiana serves as the first intermediate host for the trematode Clonorchis sinensis.

References

External links 

Bithyniidae
Gastropods described in 1888